George Wass (6 February 1882 – 15 June 1966) was an English cricketer. He was a right-handed batsman and a right-arm medium-pace and leg-break bowler who played for Nottinghamshire. He was born in Worksop and died in Liverpool.

Wass made a single first-class appearance, during the 1910 season, against Marylebone Cricket Club. He scored a duck in the only innings in which he batted, as no play was possible on Day 2 or Day 3 of the match.

He played two games for the Second XI in the Minor Counties Championship.

External links
George Wass at Cricket Archive 

1882 births
1966 deaths
English cricketers
Nottinghamshire cricketers
Sportspeople from Worksop
Cricketers from Nottinghamshire